Immunology is a monthly peer-reviewed medical journal covering all aspects of immunology. The editor-in-chief is Greg Delgoffe (University of Pittsburgh). It was established in 1958 and is published by Wiley-Blackwell. Through 2021, Immunology was an official journal of the British Society for Immunology.

Abstracting and indexing 
The journal is abstracted and indexed in:

According to the Journal Citation Reports, the journal has a 2020 impact factor of 7.397.

References

External links 
 

Immunology journals
Publications established in 1958
Wiley-Blackwell academic journals
Monthly journals
English-language journals